The .454 Casull is a firearm cartridge, developed as a wildcat cartridge in 1958 by Dick Casull, Duane Marsh and Jack Fullmer. It was announced in November 1959 by Guns & Ammo magazine. The design is a lengthened and structurally improved .45 Colt case. The wildcat cartridge went mainstream when Freedom Arms brought a single action five-shot revolver chambered in .454 Casull to the retail firearms market in 1983. Ruger followed in 1997, chambering its Super Redhawk in this caliber. Taurus followed with the Raging Bull model in 1998 and the Taurus Raging Judge Magnum in 2010.
The .45 Schofield and .45 Colt cartridges can fit into the .454's chambers, but not the other way around because of the lengthened case (very similar to the relationship between .38 Special and .357 Magnum cartridges, as well as the .44 Special and .44 Magnum cartridges).

Specifications
The .454 Casull was finally commercialized in 1997, when SAAMI published its first standards for the cartridge. The new Casull round uses a small rifle primer rather than a pistol primer, because it develops extremely high chamber pressures of over 60,000 CUP (copper units of pressure) (410 MPa), and the rifle primer has a significantly stronger CUP than a pistol primer.

The round is one of the most powerful handgun cartridges in production.  The .454 Casull generates almost 5 times the recoil of the .45 Colt, and about 75% more recoil energy than the .44 Magnum. It can deliver a 250 grain (16 g) bullet with a muzzle velocity of over 1,900 feet per second (580 m/s), developing up to 2,000 ft-lb (2.7 kJ) of energy from a handgun. One Buffalo Bore loading drives a heavier, 300 grain, JFN bullet at 1,650 ft/s for 1,813 ft-lb of muzzle energy. The .454 Casull round is primarily intended for hunting medium or large game, metallic silhouette shooting, and bear protection.

The Casull cartridges were originally loaded with a triplex load of propellants, which gave progressive burning, aided by the rifle primer ignition, resulting in a progressive acceleration of the bullet as it passed through the barrel.

Similar cartridges

The first commercially available revolver chambered in .454 Casull was made by Freedom Arms in 1983 as a five-shot single action Model 83 revolver that is capable of firing .45 ACP, .45 Colt and .454 Casull with interchangeable cylinders.  The .460 Smith & Wesson Magnum cartridge introduced in 2005 is a lengthened .454 Casull cartridge and has the same diameter as a .45 Colt or .454 Casull. Therefore, revolvers chambered for .460 S&W will also chamber .454 Casull, .45 Colt, and .45 Schofield (.45 Smith & Wesson).

See also
11 mm caliber
List of cartridges by caliber
List of handgun cartridges
Table of handgun and rifle cartridges

References

.454 Casull firearms
Magnum pistol cartridges
Pistol and rifle cartridges
Rimmed cartridges